Maimajhuwa is a town and Village Development Committee  in Ilam District in the Province No. 1 of eastern Nepal. At the time of the 1991 Nepal census it had a population of 3,543 persons living in 578 individual households.

Maimajhuwa is known as village of santapur, from where we can sunrise like shree antu illam, it's also one historical and some where we can get tourism benefit like other.

References

External links
UN map of the municipalities of Ilam District

Populated places in Ilam District